Esko Ilmari Niemi (b. 11 June 1934 in Tampere, Finland - d. 8 November 2013) was a professional ice hockey player who played in the SM-liiga.  He played for Tappara and TPS. He was inducted into the Finnish Hockey Hall of Fame in 1985.

References

External links
Finnish Hockey Hall of Fame bio

1934 births
2013 deaths
Finnish ice hockey goaltenders
HC TPS players
Ice hockey people from Tampere
Ice hockey players at the 1960 Winter Olympics
Olympic ice hockey players of Finland
Tappara players